The women's scratch competition at the 2018 UEC European Track Championships was held on 3 August 2018.

Results
First rider across the line without a net lap loss wins.

References

Women's scratch
European Track Championships – Women's scratch